Singapore competed at the 1952 Summer Olympics in Helsinki, Finland.

Athletes
The following Singaporean athletes participated in the games:

Athletics
Tang Pui Wah

Swimming
Neo Chwee Kok

Weightlifting
Chay Weng Yew (6th place)
Lon Bin Mohamed Noor (8th place)
Thong Saw Pak

References

Official Olympic Reports

Nations at the 1952 Summer Olympics
1952
Oly